Billy Taylor (1921–2010) was an American jazz pianist.

Billy Taylor or Bill Taylor may also refer to:

Sport

American and Canadian football 
 Billy Taylor (running back, born 1956), former American football running back for the New York Giants, New York Jets and Los Angeles Raiders
 Billy Taylor (running back, born 1949), former American and Canadian football running back for the Calgary Stampeders

Baseball 
 Billy Taylor (1880s pitcher) (1855–1900), baseball pitcher
 Billy Taylor (third baseman) (1870–1905), baseball infielder
 Bill Taylor (baseball) (1929–2011), baseball outfielder
 Billy Taylor (1990s pitcher) (born 1961), baseball pitcher

Football (soccer)
 Bill Taylor (footballer, born 1869) (1869–?), English association footballer who played for Small Heath
 Bill Taylor (footballer, born 1886) (1886–1966), English association football player with Burnley and Oldham Athletic
 Bill Taylor (footballer, born 1938), Scottish association football player with St. Johnstone
 Billy Taylor (footballer and cricketer) (1896–1986), English footballer and cricketer
 Billy Taylor (footballer, born 1939) (1939–1981), Scottish association footballer who played for Leyton Orient, Nottingham Forest and Lincoln City
 Billy Taylor (footballer, born 1898) (1898–1965), English footballer

Ice hockey 
 Billy Taylor (ice hockey, born 1919) (Billy "The Kid", 1919–1990), Canadian NHL player from 1939 to 1948
 Billy Taylor (ice hockey, born 1942) (1942–1979), Canadian NHL player for New York Rangers
 William "Lady" Taylor (1880–1942), Canadian player

Other sports
 Bill Taylor (alpine skier) (born 1956), former American alpine skier
 Bill Taylor (Australian footballer) (1902–1977), Australian rules footballer
 Billy Taylor (boxer) (1952–2022), British boxer
 Bill Taylor (cricketer, born 1947), English cricketer
 Billy Taylor (basketball) (born 1973), head coach of the Elon Phoenix men's basketball team
 Billy Taylor (cricketer, born 1977), English cricketer

Other
 Sir Bill Taylor (aviator) (1896–1966), Australian pilot and author
 Billy Taylor (jazz bassist) (1906–1986), American jazz bassist
 Bill Taylor (English politician) (born 1952), English local politician and election agent to Jack Straw
 Bill Taylor (naval officer) (born 1938), Australian naval officer and politician
 Bill Taylor (businessman), American professor and business magazine editor
 Bill Taylor (Ohio politician), member of the Ohio House of Representatives, 1995–2000
 Bill Taylor (South Carolina politician) (born 1946), American politician
 Corporal Bill Taylor, the last playable protagonist in Call of Duty 2
 William B. Taylor Jr., American diplomat

See also 
 William Taylor (disambiguation)